Collosphaera is a radiolarian genus in the family Collosphaeridae. The genus contains bioluminescent species. It is a genus of colonial radiolarians (as opposed to solitary).

Species
The following species are recognized:
Collosphaera armata Brandt
Collosphaera confossa Takahashi, 1991
Collosphaera huxleyi Mueller, 1855
Collosphaera macropora Popofsky, 1917
Collosphaera polygona Haeckel, 1887
Collosphaera tuberosa Haeckel, 1887

References

Radiolarian genera
Bioluminescent radiolarians